Aaron Massey is an American professional poker player and entrepreneur. He has been playing poker since 2002. Massey graduated from Northern Illinois University with a bachelor’s degree in finance in 2008, but left the finance world in 2009 to pursue a career in poker. He was the 2014 HPT Player of the Year. He was named one of seven “Ones to Watch” for Season XII of the WPT.

Massey has 35 cashes and 3 final tables at the World Series of Poker (WSOP) for over $580,000, among them a 3rd at the 2014 WSOP $1,500 No-Limit Hold'em event, earning $255,209. He has won 3 WSOP circuit rings with 73 cashes in circuit events for over $500,000. In August 2012, Massey came in 1st at the WinStar World Casino River Poker Series Main Event, earning him $651,559. He has 15 live titles with total live tournament earnings exceeding $4,206,120.

Massey and his older brother, Ralph Massey, are the founders of Big Cock Poker, a poker outfit out of Chicago, Illinois.

References

External links
 Official website

Living people
Year of birth missing (living people)
American poker players
Place of birth missing (living people)
Northern Illinois University alumni